Strictly Confidential may refer to:

 Confidentiality, an ethical principle
 Strictly Confidential (1919 film), a 1919 American comedy film starring Madge Kennedy
 Strictly Confidential (1934 film) or Broadway Bill, a 1934 American comedy directed by Frank Capra
 Strictly Confidential (film), a 1959 British comedy
 Strictly Confidential (TV series), a 2006 British drama series
 "Strictly Confidential", a song by Bud Powell from Jazz Giant
 "Strictly Confidential", a song by Roxy Music from For Your Pleasure
 Strictly Confidential, a book by Murray Rothbard
 "Strictly Confidential", a short story by Gordon R. Dickson collected in The Man the Worlds Rejected